The Plow Girl is a lost 1916 American drama silent film directed by Robert Z. Leonard and written by Edward Morris, Charles Sarver and Harvey F. Thew. The film stars Mae Murray, Elliott Dexter, Charles K. Gerrard, Edythe Chapman, Horace B. Carpenter and William Elmer. The film was released on November 13, 1916, by Paramount Pictures.

Plot

Cast 
Mae Murray as Margot
Elliott Dexter as John Stoddard
Charles K. Gerrard as Lord Percy
Edythe Chapman as Lady Brentwood
Horace B. Carpenter as M. Pantani
William Elmer as Kregler
Lillian Leighton as Stoddard's Mother
Jane Wolfe 
Theodore Roberts

References

External links 
 

1916 films
1910s English-language films
Silent American drama films
1916 drama films
Paramount Pictures films
Films directed by Robert Z. Leonard
American black-and-white films
Lost American films
American silent feature films
Films set in London
1916 lost films
Lost drama films
1910s American films
English-language drama films